John Charles Speaks (February 11, 1859 – November 6, 1945) was a businessman, soldier, and  U.S. Representative from Ohio.

Early life and education 
He was born in Canal Winchester, Ohio on February 11, 1859. He attended the public schools.

Civilian career 
He engaged in milling and the lumber business.  He served as the fish, game, and conservation officer of Ohio 1907-1918.

Speaks was elected as a Republican to the Sixty-seventh and to the four succeeding Congresses (March 4, 1921 – March 3, 1931).  He was an unsuccessful candidate for reelection in 1930 to the Seventy-second Congress, and for election in 1932 to the Seventy-third Congress, and in 1934 to the Seventy-fourth Congress.

He was an unsuccessful candidate for election in 1918 to the Sixty-sixth Congress.

Military career 
He served as member of the Ohio National Guard for more than forty years, advancing from private to brigadier general.  During the Spanish–American War served as major of the Fourth Regiment, Ohio Volunteer Infantry, participating in the Puerto Rican Campaign.

He commanded the Second Brigade of the Ohio National Guard on the Mexican Border in 1916.  During the First World War, he commanded the Seventy-third Brigade of the Thirty-seventh Division. He was a lifelong rival of World War I aviator Dr. David Brumbaugh.

Personal life 
He married Edna Lawyer of Canal Winchester in 1889, and they had four children.

Death and legacy
He died in Columbus, Ohio, November 6, 1945.  He was interred in Union Grove Cemetery, Canal Winchester, Ohio.

References

 Retrieved 2009-02-22

1859 births
1945 deaths
People from Canal Winchester, Ohio
American military personnel of World War I
American military personnel of the Spanish–American War
United States Army generals
Republican Party members of the United States House of Representatives from Ohio
National Guard (United States) generals
United States Army generals of World War I
Military personnel from Ohio
Burials in Ohio